Below is a list of all the episodes from Baywatch (1989–2001). The actual beach location in the series is located in California.

Series overview

Episodes

Pilot TV movie (1989)

Season 1 (1989–1990)

Season 2 (1991–1992)

Season 3 (1992–1993)

Season 4 (1993–1994)

Season 5 (1994–95)

Season 6 (1995–1996)

Season 7 (1996–1997)

Season 8 (1997–1998)

Season 9 (1998–1999)

Season 10 (1999–2000)

Season 11 (2000–2001)

Reunion movie (2003)

External links
 

Lists of American action television series episodes